Ruslan Faizovich Muratov (Russian: Руслан Фаизович Муратов), born on June 8, 1960, is a Russian music composer of pop music and film scores.

Biography
Ruslan Muratov Born and raised in the city of Astrakhan. He graduated from the Astrakhan College of Music. (orchestral, pop-jazz department); Astrakhan State Conservatory. (Conducting and choral department).

From 1990 to 2008 – musical director, arranger, composer, keyboardist of Valery Leontiev group. His songs have appeared in repertory of Leontiev in the first time in 1991 in Psychic film. A little later, his song "Nine chrysanthemum" became a hit in all radio stations and TV programs.

Film scores (selected)
Охота на изюбря (2005)
Есенин (2005)
The Turkish Gambit (2005)
Тихий Дон (2006)
Заколдованный участок (2006)
Диверсант 2: Конец войны (2007)
Я не я (2008)
The Admiral) (2008)
Исчезнувшие  (2009)
High Security Vacation(2009)
Подсадной (2010)
Vysotsky. Thank You For Being Alive (2011)
August Eighth (2012)

Popular songs
 "Nine chrysanthemum ("Девять Хризантем") by Valery Leontiev
 "Avgustin ("Августин") by Valery Leontiev
 "Do svidaniya Kilimanjaro ("До свидания, Килиманджаро") by Valery Leontiev
 "Vremya ("Время") by Valery Leontiev
 "Parahod ("Пароход") by Valery Leontiev

External links

 Ruslan Muratov on mp3.cc

1960 births
Russian composers
Russian male composers
Living people